Frisbee Forever is a 2011 video game developed by Kiloo and released on May 5, 2011 for iOS. A sequel entitled Frisbee Forever 2 was released on June 28, 2012.

Critical reception

Frisbee Forever
The original game has a Metacritic rating of 86% based on 7 critic reviews.

Slidetoplay said, "So if piloting a Frisbee through eye-pleasing environments sounds like a good time to you, you have nothing to lose by downloading Frisbee Forever." AppSafari wrote, "Frisbee Forever is a really addictive game that is hard not to fall in love with quickly. Just be careful that you don't end up spending too much money on buying the stars." Eurogamer said, "With production values that smell of money and brow-furrowing challenges, Frisbee Forever is an essential download." AppSpy said, "Take the time to pick up Frisbee Forever as it's free and fun for as long as you can enjoy grinding out coins for additional content." Gamezebo described it as "A really fun, challenging game that appeals to the kid in all of us." TouchArcade said, "It will take a ridiculous amount of grinding in order to get all of the content in the game, but thankfully the game is fun so I'll be playing it a lot anyway." PocketGamer UK wrote, "With plenty of levels and items to collect, Frisbee Forever is an enjoyable arcade title with surprisingly high production values."

Frisbee Forever 2
The sequel has a Metacritic rating of 89% based on 5 critic reviews.

SlideToPlay said, "Frisbee Forever 2 is the same game with new levels, but it's still an awesome game. " Modojo said " The core gameplay may never evolve beyond steering directionally, flying through hoops, gathering stars and proceeding along a series of on-rails levels. But it's done so competently, and with some much care and attention to detail, that you won't fail to fall in love with Kiloo's new creation." 148apps wrote, "It's a perfect distraction for days when playing the real game outdoors isn't an option. Multiplayer.it wrote, "Frisbee Forever 2 is a great action game, packed with a lot of levels, accurate touch controls and some very nice graphics and sound." PocketGamerUK said, "Frisbee Forever 2 is relaxing and satisfying, all in one free-to-play package. Comedy frisbees are surprisingly good motivation."

References

2011 video games
Android (operating system) games
IOS games
Sports video games
Video games developed in Denmark